Dolno Kosovrasti is a village in the municipality of Debar, North Macedonia. The village is inhabited by Mijaks.

Demographics
Dolno Kosovrasti has traditionally been inhabited by Orthodox Macedonians and a Muslim Macedonian (Torbeš) population of which both groups speak the Macedonian language.

As of the 2021 census, Dolno Kosovrasti had 752 residents with the following ethnic composition:
Turks 286
Macedonians 282
Others (including Torbeš) 96
Persons for whom data are taken from administrative sources 85
Albanians 3

According to the 2002 census, the village had a total of 813 inhabitants. Ethnic groups in the village include:
Macedonians 388
Turks 224
Albanians 4
Others 197

References

External links

Villages in Debar Municipality
Macedonian Muslim villages